Cho Beom-seok (born 9 January 1990) is a South Korean footballer who plays as midfielder for Bucheon FC in K League 2.

Career
Cho was selected by Jeonnam Dragons in the 2008 K League draft, but he didn't made his debut for Jeonnam. He moved to FC Seoul after his first professional club released him.

Cho Beom-seok also had an unsuccessful spell with Incheon United in 2011, and joined Korea National League side Mokpo City.

References

External links 

1990 births
Living people
Association football midfielders
South Korean footballers
Jeonnam Dragons players
FC Seoul players
Incheon United FC players
Bucheon FC 1995 players
K League 1 players
Korea National League players
K League 2 players